Heinrich Beheim (died 1403) was a German stone mason and architect in Nuremberg. His main works are the Schöner Brunnen and the porch of the Frauenkirche.

References

1403 deaths
14th-century architects
Gothic architects
Architects from Nuremberg
Year of birth missing